Francisco Domingo Barbosa Da Silveira (26 March 1944 in Tambores, Uruguay – 17 June 2015) was a Roman Catholic bishop in Uruguay.

Biography
Silveira studied Roman Catholic theology. On 17 June 1972, he was ordained a priest. On 6 March 2004, he was made bishop of the Roman Catholic Diocese of Minas. In 2009, he was extorted by two prisoners, with whom he had reportedly had previous same-sex sexual relations.

He subsequently resigned in accordance with the norms of canon law after an investigation from the Holy See.

References

External links
Profile, Catholic-Hierarchy.org; accessed 19 June 2015.

Bishops appointed by Pope John Paul II
20th-century Roman Catholic bishops in Uruguay
Religious scandals
1944 births
2015 deaths
People from Paysandú Department
Place of death missing
Uruguayan Roman Catholic bishops
Roman Catholic bishops of Minas